Stärker als die Nacht is an East German film directed by Slátan Dudow. It was released in January 1954.

Cast

 Wilhelm Koch-Hooge: Hans Löning
 Helga Göring: Gerda Löning
 Kurt Oligmüller: Erich Bachmann
 Rita Gödikmeier: Lotte Bachmann
 Harald Halgardt: Eddi Nohl
 Helmut Schreiber: Hackelbusch
 Peter Priemer: Klaus-Peter Löning
 Manfred Borges: Helmut Karsten
 Hans Wehrl: Bernhard Manthey
 Erika Dunkelmann: Käthe Manthey
 Aribert Grimmer: Langer, hagerer Arbeiter
 Heinz Hinze: Herr Globig
 Gertrud Brendler: Frau Globig
 Johannes Arpe: Gauleiter
 Adolf Peter Hoffmann: Kriminalkommissar Knappe
 Theo Shall: Dr. Panneck
 Hans-Joachim Büttner: Dr. Hermes
 Wolfgang Hübner: Günther
 Achim Hübner: Rezitator
 Martin Knapfel: Meister
 Grete Carlsohn: Bäckersfrau
 Gustav Püttjer: Kraftfahrer
 Harro ten Brook: Polizeioffizier
 Anna-Maria Besendahl: Zimmerwirtin
 Karl Brenk: Gefängniswärter
 Hermann Dieckhoff: Geistlicher
 Fredy Barten: Gastwirt
 Ada Mahr: Portiersfrau
 Jean Brahn: Gastwirt
 Wolfgang Brunecker: SS-Posten
 Ursula Dücker: Krankenschwester
 Edith Volkmann: Junge Arbeiterin
 Fritz Löffler: Mann mit Hakenkreuz
 Waldhorst Schmidt: SS-Offizier
 Paul Pfingst: Bauarbeiter
 Brigitte Keppler: Aufnahmeschwester
 Horst Schumann: Schupo-Offizier
 Trude Brentina: Kundin im Bäckerladen
 Werner Finck: Kommentarsprecher
 Inge Bartel: Kommentarsprecherin
 Karl Block: Gefängniswärter
 Alif Mohamed: Spanier
 Ursula Hermann: Sekretärin bei Hackelbusch
 Manfred Frömchen: Personalleiter
 Christoph Beyertt: Junger Arbeiter
 Otto Saltzmann: Älterer Häftling
 Kurt Barthel: Arbeiter
 Gerry Wolff: Gefangener

External links
 

1954 films
East German films
1950s German-language films
Films directed by Slatan Dudow
German black-and-white films
German drama films
1954 drama films
1950s German films